Blak and Blu is the major-label debut studio album by American musician Gary Clark Jr., released on October 22, 2012. The album touches on a wide variety of traditionally black music genres, including soul ("Please Come Home"), hip-hop/R&B ("The Life"), Chuck Berry-esque rock and roll ("Travis County"), and Clark's trademark, blues ("When My Train Pulls In", "Numb", "Next Door Neighbor Blues").

Blak and Blu netted Clark his first two Grammy Award nominations, one for Best Rock Song ("Ain't Messin Round") and the other for Best Traditional R&B Performance ("Please Come Home") which won. This marked the first time that an artist was nominated in both categories in the same year. It peaked at number six on the Billboard 200 album chart, and number one on the Blues Albums chart.

Critical reception

Blak and Blu was awarded a three-and-a-half star rating by Rolling Stone and was listed at  27 on Rolling Stones list of the top 50 albums of 2012, in which the author said "Clark's brain-frying guitar solos are more about noise nuance and phrasing than speed-trial note-spitting." The Chicago Tribune gave the album a 2.5 out of 4 review, stating that the album lacked cohesiveness and consistency due to the wide variety of genres featured.

In 2013, Blak and Blu was nominated for a Blues Music Award in the 'Contemporary Blues Album' category.

Track listing
All songs written by Gary Clark Jr., except as noted.

Blak and Blu The Mixtape

On April 30, 2014, Gary Clark Jr. also released a mixtape of the songs under the title Blak and Blu The Mixtape presented by D-Nice.

Track list

Personnel
 Gary Clark Jr. – lead and backing vocals, lead and rhythm guitar, bass, drums, programming, trumpet, percussion, congas
 Eric Zapata – rhythm guitars
 Mike Elizondo – bass, fuzz guitar, keyboards, percussion, programming
 Zac Rae – Keyboards, hammond organ, wurlitzer, piano, vibraphone
 J.J. Johnson – drums, percussion
 Scott Nelson – bass
 Satnam Ramgotra – tabla, percussion
 Danny T. Levin – trumpet, trombone, flugelhorn
 David Moyer – tenor saxophone, baritone saxophone
 Stevie Black – strings
 Recording engineers: Adam Hawkins, Doug McKean
 Mixing: Adam Hawkins, Doug McKean
 Assistant engineers: Brent Arrowood, Chris Sporleder, Russ Waugh
 Mastering: Ted Jensen
 A&R: Lenny Waronker
 Creative design, direction and photography: Frank Maddocks

Charts

References

2012 debut albums
Gary Clark Jr. albums
Albums produced by Mike Elizondo
Warner Records albums